Cocinor was a French film production and distribution company based in Paris. Established in 1948 its full name is the Compagnie cinématographique du Nord. It was founded by Ignace Morgenstern out of a former distribution company SEDIF he had previously worked for. The company was later sold to Edmond Tenoudji. The company took over Les Films Marceau and distributed some films under the name Cocinor-Marceau. It also acquired the back catalogue of Charles Delac's old company.

The company established its reputation in the 1950s by releasing a number of commercial hits including comedies. The company also handled films by French New Wave directors from the late 1950s onwards.

References

Bibliography
 Crisp, C.G. The Classic French Cinema, 1930-1960. Indiana University Press, 1993 
 De Baecque, Antoine & Toubiana, Serge. Truffaut: A Biography.  University of California Press, 2000.
 Marie, Michel. The French New Wave: An Artistic School. John Wiley & Sons, 2008.

French film studios
Film production companies of France
Film distributors of France